Orlando Chaves (2 March 1921 – September 1976) was a Guyanese weightlifter. He competed in the men's middleweight event at the 1948 Summer Olympics.

References

1921 births
1976 deaths
Guyanese male weightlifters
Olympic weightlifters of British Guiana
Weightlifters at the 1948 Summer Olympics
Place of birth missing